Boulogne-sur-Mer (or Bononia), often called just Boulogne, is a coastal city in Northern France. It is a sub-prefecture of the department of Pas-de-Calais. Boulogne lies on the Côte d'Opale, a touristic stretch of French coast on the English Channel between Calais and Normandy, and the most visited location in the region after the Lille conurbation. Boulogne is its department's second-largest city after Calais, and the 183rd-largest in France. It is also the country's largest fishing port, specialising in herring.

Boulogne is an ancient town and was the main Roman port for trade and communication with its Province of Britain. After a period of Germanic presence following the collapse of the Empire, Boulogne was integrated into the County of Boulogne of the Kingdom of France during the Middle Ages. It was occupied by the Kingdom of England numerous times due to conflict between the two nations. In 1805 it was a staging area for Napoleon's troops for several months during his planned invasion of the United Kingdom.

The city's 12th-century belfry is recognised by UNESCO as a World Heritage Site (along with other belfries of Belgium and France), while another popular attraction is the marine conservation centre Nausicaa.

Name
The French name Boulogne derives from the Latin Bononia, which was also the Roman name for Bologna in Italy. Both places – and Vindobona (Vienna) – are thought to have derived from native Celtic placenames, with bona possibly meaning "foundation", "citadel", or "granary". The French epithet -Mer ("on-the-sea") distinguishes the city from Boulogne-Billancourt on the edge of Paris. In turn, the Boulogne in Boulogne-Billancourt originates from a church there dedicated to Notre-Dame de Boulogne, "Our Lady of Boulogne[-sur-Mer]".

History

Origin of the city

The foundation of the city known to the Romans as Gesoriacum is credited to the Celtic Boii. In the past, it was sometimes conflated with Caesar's Portus Itius, but that is now thought to have been a site near Calais which has since silted up. A tall lighthouse was built at Gesoriacum circa 39 AD by order of the Emperor Caligula, possibly in preparation for an invasion of Britain. Known as the Tour d'Ordre, coastal erosion caused it to topple into the sea in 1644.From the time of Claudius's invasion in AD 43, Gesoriacum formed the major port connecting the rest of the empire to Britain. It was the chief base of the Roman navy's Britannic fleet until the rebellion of its admiral Carausius in 286. As part of the imperial response, the junior emperor Constantius Chlorus successfully besieged it by land and sea in 293. The name of the settlement was changed to Bononia at some point between the sack of Gesoriacum and 310, possibly as a consequence of its refounding or possibly by the replacement of the sacked and lower-lying city by another nearby community.

The city was an important town of the Morini (the 'sea people'), and Zosimus called it Germanorum ("Germanic-speaking") at the end of the 4th century.

Middle Ages

In the Middle Ages Boulogne was the capital of an eponymous county, founded in the mid-9th century. An important Count, Eustace II, assisted William the Conqueror in his conquest of England. His wife founded the city's Notre Dame cathedral, which became a site of pilgrimage from the 12th century onwards, attended by fourteen French kings and five of England. It was an important whaling center prior to 1121. The city survived on herring fishing and received its municipal charter from Count Renaud of Dammartin in 1203.

The area was fought over by the French and the English, including several English occupations during the course of the Hundred Years War. In 1492 Henry VII laid siege to Boulogne before the conflict was ended by the Peace of Étaples. Boulogne was again occupied by the English from 1544 to 1550. In 1550, The Peace of Boulogne ended the war of England with Scotland and France. France bought back Boulogne for 400,000 crowns. A culture of smuggling was present in the city until 1659, when French gains in Flanders from the Treaty of the Pyrenees moved the border northwards.

19th century 

Boulogne received its current status as a  subprefecture of the Pas-de-Calais department in 1800 due to the territorial re-organisation in Revolutionary France. France became the  French Empire in 1804; in 1803 Boulogne became an Imperial City (Ville Impériale).

The 19th century was a prosperous one for Boulogne, which became a bathing resort for wealthy Parisians after the 1848 completion of the Longueau–Boulogne railway connecting the town with the French capital. In the 19th century, the Basilica of Notre-Dame de Boulogne was reconstructed by the priest Benoît Haffreingue, who claimed to have received a call from God in 1820 to reconstruct the town's ruined basilica. During the Napoleonic Wars, Napoleon amassed La Grande Armée in Boulogne to invade the United Kingdom in 1805. However, his plans were halted by  other European matters and by the supremacy of the Royal Navy.

A nephew of Napoleon Bonaparte, Louis-Napoleon Bonaparte (subsequently the emperor Napoleon III), returned to France in secret from his exile in Britain, passing through Boulogne in August 1840. He was later jailed for trying to lead a revolt in Strasbourg.

World wars

During the First World War, this was the entrepôt for the first unit of the British Expeditionary Force to land in France and for many others thereafter. Boulogne was one of the three base ports most extensively used by the Commonwealth armies on the Western Front throughout the First World War. It was closed and cleared on 27 August 1914 when the Allies were forced to fall back ahead of the German advance, but was opened again in October and from that month to the end of the war, Boulogne and Wimereux formed one of the chief hospital areas.

Until June 1918, the dead from the hospitals at Boulogne were buried in the Cimetiere de L'Est, one of the town's cemeteries, the Commonwealth graves forming a long, narrow strip along the right hand edge of the cemetery. In the spring of 1918, it was found that space was running short in the Eastern Cemetery in spite of repeated extensions to the south and the site of the new cemetery at Terlincthun was chosen. It also was the site of an Allied (French and British) armaments production conference.

On 22 May 1940 during the Battle of France, two British Guards battalions and some pioneers attempted to defend Boulogne against an attack by the German 2nd Panzer Division. Despite fierce fighting, the British were overwhelmed and the survivors were evacuated by Royal Navy destroyers while under direct German gunfire. On 15 June 1944, 297 aircraft (155 Avro Lancasters, 130 Handley Page Halifaxes, and 12 De Havilland Mosquitos) of the Royal Air Force bombed Boulogne harbour to suppress German naval activity following D-Day. Some of the Lancasters carried Tallboy bombs and the harbour and the surrounding area were completely destroyed. In August 1944 the town was declared a "fortress" by Adolf Hitler but it succumbed to Operation Wellhit, the assault and liberation by the 3rd Canadian Infantry Division in September. In one incident, a French civilian guided the Canadians to a "secret passage" leading into the walled old town and by-passing the German defenders.

To replace the destroyed urban infrastructure, affordable housing and public facility projects in functional, brutalist building styles were carried out in the 1950s and 60s.

Geography

Location
Boulogne-sur-Mer is in Northern France, at the edge of the Channel and in the mouth of the river "Liane".

Boulogne is a relatively important city of the North, exercising an influence on the "Boulonnais" territory (74 towns and villages which surround Boulogne). The coast consists of important tourist natural sites, like the capes Gris Nez and Blanc Nez (which are the closest points of France to England), and attractive seaside resorts like Wimereux, Wissant, Hardelot and Le Touquet. The hinterland is mainly rural and agricultural.

Transport

Boulogne is close to the A16 motorway (Paris-Amiens-Calais-Dunkerque). Metropolitan bus services are operated by "Marinéo". The company Flixbus propose a bus line connecting Paris to Boulogne. There are coach services to Calais and Dunkerque.

The city has railway stations, which the most important is Boulogne-Ville station, located in the south of the city. Boulogne-Tintelleries station is used by regional trains. It is located near the university and the city centre. The former Boulogne-Maritime and Boulogne-Aéroglisseurs stations served as a boat connection (to England) for the railway.

Boulogne has no cross channel ferry services since the closure of the route to Dover by LD Lines in 2010.

The regional trains are TER Hauts-de-France run by SNCF.  The principal service runs from Gare de Boulogne-Ville via Gare de Calais-Fréthun, Gare de Calais-Ville to Gare de Lille-Flandres.

Urbanization

The city is divided into several parts :
 City centre : groups historic and administrative buildings, and also accommodations, stores, banks, churches, pedestrian streets and places.
 Fortified town : old-town where are a lot of historic monuments (the castle-museum, the basilica, the belfry, the imperial palace) and also the city hall and the courthouse. it is surrounded by 13th-century ramparts very appreciated today by walkers.
 Gambetta-Sainte-Beuve : tourist area situated in the northwest of the city, on the edge of the beach and the recreational harbour.
 Capécure : economic and industrial area, situated in the west of the city, around the harbour.
 Saint-Pierre (Saint Peter) : former neighborhood of the fishermen, destroyed during World War II and reconstructed after.
 Chemin Vert (Green path) : zone created in the 1950s, knowing today poverty and unemployment. it is the neighborhood of Franck Ribéry.
 Dernier Sou (Last penny) : residential area situated in the east of the city.
 Beaurepaire (Beautiful hideout) : residential area situated in the north of the city.
 Bréquerecque : residential area situated in the south of the city.

Climate
Boulogne-sur-Mer has an oceanic climate that has chilly winters not far above freezing and cool summers tempered by its exposure to the sea. Considering its position, the climate is quite cold in relation to south and east coast locations in England year round. Precipitation is also higher than in said southern English locations.

Sights

Boulogne's 12th-century belfry is one of 56 listed Belfries of Belgium and France, all in northeastern France and Belgium,  with shared World Heritage Site status because of their architecture and testimony to the rise of municipal power in the region. It is the oldest building in the upper city of Boulogne, and currently serves as the home to a museum of Celtic remains from the Roman occupation. Founded as the Count's dungeon, the top floor was added in the 13th century. Damage by a fire in 1712 was built over by 1734.

Other than the belfry there are also the following sights:

Medieval walls 1,500 metres long, with 4 gates and 17 towers from the 13th century 
Medieval castle, whose foundations date to Roman times. It houses an Egyptian art collection, and the ancient Greek Suicide of Ajax Vase.
Gothic church of St Nicholas, housing several 15th-century statues
Cathedral basilica of Notre-Dame, with a dome standing at over 100 m. The crypt is one of the largest in France, and has Roman, Romanesque and Gothic elements.
Opened in 1991, Nausicaä – The French National Sea Centre is a science centre entirely dedicated to the relationship between mankind and the sea. It houses Aquaria, exhibitions on marine fauna, and the exploitation and management of marine resources (fisheries, aquaculture, coastal planning, maritime transport, exploitation of energies and mineral, tourism).
 The Boulogne Eastern Cemetery, created during the Great War
 Colonne de la Grande Armée – Statue of Napoleon I

Official website: Tourism in Boulogne sur Mer
Official website: Tourism in Boulogne sur Mer and the Boulonnais region

Economy
Boulogne-sur-Mer is an important fishing port, with 7,000 inhabitants deriving part, or all, of their livelihoods from fishing.

IFREMER (the French Research Institute for Exploitation of the Sea) and the Pasteur Institute are located in Boulogne Port.

Certain brands, including Crown and Findus, have regional offices in Boulogne.

Media
 Radio : France Bleu Nord, Virgin Radio Côte d'Opale
 Television : France 3 Côte d'Opale
 Print : La Voix du Nord (édition de Boulogne sur Mer), La Semaine dans le Boulonnais, Touzazimut

Events
In 1905, the first World Esperanto Congress was held in Boulogne-sur-Mer, where the historic Declaration of Boulogne was ratified. L. L. Zamenhof, the creator of Esperanto, was among the attendees. In 2005, there was an anniversary celebration to mark the centenary with more than 500 attendees.

Administration
 Boulogne is the seat of the Communauté d'agglomération du Boulonnais

Population

In 2018, 40,664 people lived in the city, while its metropolitan area had a population of 160,130.

Education

Boulogne-sur-Mer hosts one of the oldest Universités de l'été – summer courses in French language and culture. It is known as the Université d'été de Boulogne-sur-Mer.

The Saint-Louis building of the University of the Côte d'Opale's Boulogne campus opened its doors in 1991, on the site of the former St. Louis Hospital, the front entrance to which remains a predominant architectural feature. Its 6 major specialisms are Modern Languages, French Literature, Sport, Law, History and Economics.
The university is situated in the town centre, about 5 minutes from the Boulogne Tintelleries railway station.

University
 Campus University of the Littoral Opal Coast (Saint-Louis, Grand-Rue and Capérure site), member of Université Lille Nord de France.

Public primary and secondary

 High schools : Lycée Auguste Mariette, Edouard Branly, Cazin (professional).
 College : College Langevin, Angelier, Daunou.

Private primary and secondary
 High schools: Lycée Nazareth, Haffreingue, Saint-Joseph
 College: College Godefroy de Bouillon, Haffreingue, Nazareth, Saint-Joseph

Health
Two health centres are located in Boulogne, the public Hospital Duchenne and the private Clinique de la côte d'opale.

Sports

Boulogne's football club, US Boulogne Côte d'Opale (US refers to Union Sportive), is one of the oldest in France due to the city's proximity to England, founded in 1898. The club currently play in the third tier, the Championnat National, and host home matches at the 14,500-capacity Stade de la Libération. Boulogne native and FIFA World Cup finalist Franck Ribéry began his career at the club.

Basketball teams in Boulogne include Stade Olympique Maritime Boulonnais and ESSM Le Portel of Pro A (first-tier men's professional basketball league in France).

Culture
 The Château de Boulogne-sur-Mer (now a castle museum) of Boulogne, in the fortified town, houses the most important exhibition of masks from Alaska in the world, the second largest collection of Greek ceramics in France (after the Louvre), collections of Roman and medieval sculptures, paintings (15th–20th century), an Egyptian collection, African Arts etc. As these collections are exhibited in a medieval castle, one can also discover the Roman walls (in the underground) as well as rooms built in the 13th century (La Barbière, banqueting hall, chapel, covered parapet walk...)
 La Casa San Martin is currently a museum where José de San Martín the leader of independence struggle in Argentina (also Chile and Peru) died in 1850, from 1930 to 1967 this house was the consulate of Argentina in France. There is a statue dedicated to his colleague Simón Bolívar, other liberator of South America in the revolutions against Spanish colonial rule in the 1810s. Bolivar planned to head in exile to this very part of France before his death in 1830. Historic emigration in the 19th century from the Nord-Pas de Calais region to Argentina and Chile can explain some cultural ties with South America of the Boulognais and Latino/Ibero-American culture. 
 Nausicaä, the French national sealife centre.

Food
As an international maritime port on the English Channel (La Manche), the town of Boulogne-sur-Mer has European and American influences in local cuisine. They include:
 Welsh rarebit (from Wales, United Kingdom)
 Sandwich américain (an American sandwich introduced from the USA)
 Kipper (Flemish: smoked herring)

Notable people

Born in Boulogne

 Matilda of Boulogne (1105–1152), Countess of Boulogne and queen consort of England; the wife of Stephen, King of England (reigned 1135–1154)
 Michel Le Quien (1661–1733), monk and historian.
 Pierre Claude François Daunou (1761–1840), politician and historian
 Frédéric Sauvage (1786–1857), engineer and a pioneer of the propeller
 Charles Augustin Sainte-Beuve (1804–1869), literary critic and one of the major figures of French literary history
 Guillaume Duchenne (1806–1875), neurologist
 Auguste Delacroix (1809-1868), painter
 Auguste Mariette (1821–1881), scholar and archaeologist, one of the foremost Egyptologists of his generation, and the founder of the Egyptian Museum in Cairo
 Joseph O'Kelly (1828–1885), composer and pianist
 Auguste O'Kelly (1829–1900), music publisher
 Charles Frédéric O'Kelly (1830–1897), managing director of Blanzy-Poure
 George O'Kelly (1831–1914), pianist and composer
 Alexandre Guilmant (1837–1911), organist/composer
 Étienne-Prosper Berne-Bellecour (1838–1910), painter
 Benoît-Constant Coquelin (1841–1909), actor
 Ernest Hamy (1842–1908), anthropologist/ethnologist; created (in 1880) the museum of ethnography of Trocadéro (today known as the Musée de l'Homme, Trocadéro)
 Ernest Alexandre Honoré Coquelin (1848–1909), actor
 Olivier Latry (1962), Titular Organist of the Cathedral of Notre Dame in Paris, and professor at the Paris Conservatory 
 Henri Malo (1868–1948), writer and historian
 Léo Marjane (1912–2016), singer
 Georges Mathieu (1921–2012), famous painter, initiator of "lyrical abstraction" and informal art
 Michel Caffier (born 1930), writer and literary critic
 Sophie Daumier (1934–2004), film actress
 Estha Essombe (born 1963), judoka
 Jean-Pierre Papin (born 1963), footballer
 David Ringot (born 1969), footballer
 Mickaël Bourgain (born 1980), track cyclist
 Franck Ribéry (born 1983), footballer
 Terence Makengo (born 1992), footballer

Others associated with Boulogne

 Godfrey of Bouillon (c.1060–1100), Count of Boulogne, prominent figure in the First Crusade
 Baldwin I of Jerusalem (c.1058–1118), Count of Boulogne, prominent figure in the First Crusade
 Blaise de Monluc (1502–1577), Marshal of France
 Richard Martin (1754–1834), Irish parliamentarian and animal rights campaigner; exiled to Boulogne in 1826, where he died
 Smithson Tennant (1761–1815), chemist, discoverer of osmium and iridium, died falling from a bridge in Boulogne
 Romeo Coates (1772–1848), amateur actor, fled from London to Boulogne to escape debtor's prison. He lived there for several years, and met his wife during this period.
 Adam Liszt (1776–1827), father of Franz Liszt, died from Typhoid fever while on a vacation
 José de San Martín (1778–1850), Argentine general who liberated Argentina, Chile and Peru; lived for two years in Boulogne and died there
 John Short Hewett (1781–1835), British cleric and academic, died there
 Benoît-Agathon Haffreingue (1785–1871), priest and builder of Boulogne's cathedral
 Félix Godefroid (1818–1897), Belgium-born composer, grew up in Boulogne
 Constant Coquelin (1841–1909), actor
 John McCrae (1872–1918), Canadian doctor, poet; author of In Flanders Field
 Alfred-Georges Regner (1902–1987), painter-engraver
 Maurice Boitel (1919–2007), painter
 Olivier Latry (born 1962), musician, educator
 N'Golo Kanté (born 1991), footballer

International relations

Boulogne-sur-Mer is twinned with:
Folkestone, Kent, United Kingdom
La Plata, Argentina
Safi, Morocco – since 2007
Deux-Ponts (Zweibrücken), Germany – since 1959

See also
 Boulonnais (land area)
 First Siege of Boulogne
 Itius Portus
 Vieux-Boulogne

References

Further reading

External links

 
Website about Boulogne-sur-Mer (English only)
IGN 
Official website: Tourism in Boulogne sur Mer and the Boulonnais area (in English)
Boulogne-sur-Mer city council website (in French)
Visiting Boulogne-sur-Mer (English guide and tourist map)
 NAUSICAÄ's official website (in French and English)
 Boulogne 2005 Esperanto
 Universite d'ete de Boulogne-sur-Mer 
 The university library of ULCO
 The Boulogne Eastern Cemetery on the website "Remembrance Trails of the Great War in Northern France"

 
Communes of Pas-de-Calais
Subprefectures in France
Napoleon's planned invasion of the United Kingdom
Port cities and towns on the French Atlantic coast
Ports and harbours of Hauts-de-France
Fortified settlements
Morini
Gallia Belgica